Richard Warwick (29 April 1945 – 16 December 1997) was an English actor.

He was born Richard Carey Winter, the third of four sons, at Meopham, Kent, and made his film debut in Franco Zeffirelli's 1968 production of Romeo and Juliet in the role of Gregory. Subsequent films included If...., Nicholas and Alexandra and the first film by Derek Jarman, Sebastiane.

On television, he was best known for his roles in the sitcom Please Sir!, as one of the main character's teaching colleagues, and in the London Weekend Television comedy A Fine Romance, as the brother-in-law of Judi Dench's character. He also played Uncas in the television series The Last of the Mohicans (1971). His last role was as John (the servant) in Zeffirelli's 1996 adaptation of Jane Eyre.

He died in 1997 aged 52 from an AIDS-related illness. In an obituary, The Daily Telegraph quoted If... director Lindsay Anderson: "I never met a young actor like Richard! Without a touch of vanity, completely natural yet always concentrated, he illumines every frame of the film in which he appears."

Filmography

References

External links

1945 births
1997 deaths
People from Meopham
English male film actors
English male television actors
AIDS-related deaths in England
English gay actors
Male actors from Kent
20th-century English male actors
20th-century English LGBT people